Events in the year 1181 in Japan.

Incumbents
Monarch: Antoku

Events
January - The Imperial Capital moves from Fukuhara-kyō back to Heian-kyō

Deaths
January 30 - Emperor Takakura (b. 1161)

References

 
 
Japan
Years of the 12th century in Japan